The Nightcomers is the debut studio album by Scottish heavy metal band Holocaust, released in 1981 at the apex of the new wave of British heavy metal phenomenon. The album was released by Holocaust's own label Phoenix Record And Filmworks and re-issued on CD by Edgy Records only in 2000. It was remastered and re-issued as a double CD by Castle/Sanctuary in 2003, including all the tracks from the "Smokin' Valves", "Heavy Metal Mania", and "Coming Through" singles and from the Live from the Raw Loud 'n' Live Tour EP.

Track listing

The song "Death or Glory" was covered by American death metal band Six Feet Under on their 1997 album Warpath, as well as by German power metal Band Gamma Ray in their 2013 EP Master of Confusion. Gamma Ray also covered the song "Heavy Metal Mania" in 1995 in their single "Rebellion in a Dreamland" (later included as bonus track on the album Land of the Free re-issued).

Personnel
Band members
 Gary Lettice – vocals
 John Mortimer – guitars
 Ed Dudley – guitars
 Robin Begg – bass
 Paul Collins – drums

Additional musicians
Raymond Marciano – drums on tracks 20-22

Production
Robert Bell – producer
Calum Malcom – engineer

References

External links
Holocaust biography

1981 debut albums
Holocaust (band) albums